Quit It is a 2002 novel by Marcia Byalick about a young girl living with Tourette syndrome (TS). It was her first novel for Delacorte Press. The book centers on Carrie, a seventh-grade girl who has just been diagnosed with TS.  Targeted to early teens, Quit It explores Carrie's struggles to cope with TS while trying to fit in with her peers.

References

External links
 Sørensen, Bent. Tourette in Fiction: Lethem, Lefcourt, Hecht, Rubio, Byalick (PDF).  Aalborg University, Denmark.  Retrieved on August 21, 2009.

Works about Tourette syndrome
2002 American novels